Malamir was the ruler of Bulgaria in 831–836.

Malamir was a son of Omurtag and a grandson of Krum. His name may be of Slavic origin, which would make him the first Bulgar khan to possess a Slavic name; this has led to the speculation that his mother was a Slav, although that cannot be proven. Another theory is that it was an Iranian name, as there is an Iranian city named Malamir. 

Malamir became ruler of Bulgaria in 831 on the death of his father Omurtag, because his older brother Enravota (Voin) had forfeited his right to the succession by becoming a Christian. It is possible that Malamir was young and inexperienced at the time of his accession, and that affairs of state were managed by his kavhan (kaukhanos) Isbul.

About 833, Malamir executed his brother Enravota for refusing to renounce Christianity. After the expiration of the original 30-year peace treaty with the Byzantine Empire in 836, emperor Theophilos ravaged the regions inside the Bulgarian frontier. The Bulgarians retaliated, and under the leadership of Isbul they reached Adrianople. At this time, if not earlier, the Bulgarians annexed Philippopolis (Plovdiv) and its environs. Several surviving monumental inscriptions from this reign make reference to the Bulgarian victories and others to the continuation of construction activities in and near Pliska. Malamir died in 836, allegedly as retribution for his execution of his older brother.

In several older studies, Malamir is identified with his successor Presian I, and it is assumed that he survived until the 850s as the direct predecessor of Boris I. This is very unlikely, as Malamir is attested as having been succeeded by his nephew (the son of his brother Zvinitsa), while Boris I was preceded by his father Presian I. Zlatarski resolved the problems in the fragmentary sources by determining that Malamir's unnamed nephew and successor was in fact Presian I, and Boris I was the latter's son.

The 17th century Volga Bulgar compilation Cäğfär Taríxı (a work of disputed authenticity) represents Balamir (i.e., Malamir) as the son of Yomyrčak (i.e., Omurtag), and as the brother of Sabanša (i.e., Zvinica), who was the father of Birdžihan (i.e., Presian I).

Malamir Knoll on Greenwich Island in the South Shetland Islands, Antarctica, is named for Khan Malamir of Bulgaria.

See also 
 History of Bulgaria
 Bulgars

References

Sources 
 Jordan Andreev, Ivan Lazarov, Plamen Pavlov, Koj koj e v srednovekovna Bălgarija, Sofia 1999.
 (primary source), Bahši Iman, Džagfar Tarihy, vol. I, Orenburg 1997.

9th-century births
836 deaths
Medieval child monarchs
9th-century Bulgarian monarchs
Bulgarian people of the Byzantine–Bulgarian Wars
Turkic rulers